Kalimantania lawak is a species of cyprinid fish endemic to Indonesia occurring on the islands of Borneo and Java.  It is the only member of its genus.

References
 

Barbinae
Monotypic fish genera
Fish of Asia
Freshwater fish of Indonesia
Taxa named by Petre Mihai Bănărescu